Diborane(6), generally known as diborane, is the chemical compound with the formula B2H6. It is a toxic, colorless, and pyrophoric gas with a repulsively sweet odor. Diborane is a key boron compound with a variety of applications. It has attracted wide attention for its electronic structure. Several of its derivatives are useful reagents.

Structure and bonding 

The structure of diborane has D2h symmetry. Four hydrides are terminal, while two bridge between the boron centers. The lengths of the B–Hbridge bonds and the B–Hterminal bonds are 1.33 and 1.19 Å respectively. This difference in bond lengths reflects the difference in their strengths, the B–Hbridge bonds being relatively weaker. The weakness of the B–Hbridge compared to B–Hterminal bonds is indicated by their vibrational signatures in the infrared spectrum, being ≈2100 and 2500 cm−1 respectively.

The model determined by molecular orbital theory describes the bonds between boron and the terminal hydrogen atoms as conventional 2-center 2-electron covalent bonds. The bonding between the boron atoms and the bridging hydrogen atoms is, however, different from that in molecules such as hydrocarbons. Each boron uses two electrons in bonding to the terminal hydrogen atoms and has one valence electron remaining for additional bonding. The bridging hydrogen atoms provide one electron each. The B2H2 ring is held together by four electrons forming two 3-center 2-electron bonds. This type of bond is sometimes called a "banana bond".

B2H6 is isoelectronic with C2H62+, which would arise from the diprotonation of the planar molecule ethylene. Diborane is one of many compounds with such unusual bonding.

Of the other elements in group IIIA, gallium is known to form a similar compound digallane, Ga2H6. Aluminium forms a polymeric hydride, (AlH3)n; although unstable, Al2H6 has been isolated in solid hydrogen and is isostructural with diborane.

Production and synthesis 
Extensive studies of diborane have led to the development of multiple synthesis routes. Most preparations entail reactions of hydride donors with boron halides or alkoxides. The industrial synthesis of diborane involves the reduction of BF3 by sodium hydride (NaH), lithium hydride (LiH) or lithium aluminium hydride (LiAlH4):
 8 BF3  +  6 LiH  →  B2H6  +  6 LiBF4

Two laboratory methods start from boron trichloride with lithium aluminium hydride or from boron trifluoride ether solution with sodium borohydride. Both methods result in as much as 30% yield: 
 4 BCl3  +  3 LiAlH4  →  2 B2H6  +  3 LiAlCl4
 4 BF3  +  3 NaBH4  →  2 B2H6  +  3 NaBF4

Older methods entail the direct reaction of borohydride salts with a non-oxidizing acid, such as phosphoric acid or dilute sulfuric acid.
 2 BH4−  +  2 H+  → 2 H2 +  B2H6
Similarly, oxidation of borohydride salts has been demonstrated and remains convenient for small-scale preparations. For example, using iodine as an oxidizer:
 2   +    → 2 NaI  +    +  
Another small-scale synthesis uses potassium hydroborate and phosphoric acid as starting materials.

Reactions 

Diborane is a highly reactive and versatile reagent.

Air, water, oxygen
As a pyrophoric substance, diborane reacts exothermically with oxygen to form boron trioxide and water:
 2 B2H6 + 6 O2 → 2 B2O3 + 6 H2O (ΔHr = −2035 kJ/mol = −73.47 kJ/g)

Diborane reacts violently with water to form hydrogen and boric acid:
 B2H6 + 6 H2O → 2 B(OH)3 + 6 H2 (ΔHr = −466 kJ/mol = −16.82 kJ/g)

Diborane also reacts with alcohols similarly.  Methanol for example give hydrogen and trimethylborate:
 B2H6 + 6 MeOH → 2 B(OMe)3 + 6 H2

Lewis acidity
One dominating reaction pattern involves formation of adducts with Lewis bases. Often such initial adducts proceed rapidly to give other products. For example, borane-tetrahydrofuran, which often behaves as an equivalently to diborane, degrades to borate esters. Its adduct with dimethyl sulfide is an important reagent in organic synthesis.

With ammonia diborane forms the diammoniate of diborane, DADB with small quantities of ammonia borane as byproduct. The ratio depends on the conditions.

Hydroboration
In the hydroboration reaction, diborane also reacts readily with alkenes to form trialkylboranes.  This reaction pattern is rather general and the resulting alkyl borates can be readily derivatized, e.g. to alcohols.  Although early work on hydroboration relied on diborane, it has been replaced by borane dimethylsulfide, which is more safely handled.

Other
Pyrolysis of diborane gives hydrogen and diverse boron hydride clusters.  For example, pentaborane was first prepared by pyrolysis of diborane at about 200 °C. Although this pyrolysis route is rarely employed, it ushered in a large research theme of borane cluster chemistry.

Treating diborane with sodium amalgam gives NaBH4 and Na[B3H8]
When diborane is treated with lithium hydride in diethyl ether, lithium borohydride is formed:
 B2H6 + 2 LiH → 2 LiBH4
Diborane reacts with anhydrous hydrogen chloride or hydrogen bromide gas to give a boron halohydride:
 B2H6 + HX → B2H5X + H2      (X = Cl, Br)
Treating diborane with carbon monoxide at 470 K and 20 bar gives H3BCO.

Reagent in organic synthesis 
Diborane and its variants are central organic synthesis reagents for hydroboration. Alkenes add across the B–H bonds to give trialkylboranes, which can be further elaborated. Diborane is used as a reducing agent roughly complementary to the reactivity of lithium aluminium hydride. The compound readily reduces carboxylic acids to the corresponding alcohols, whereas ketones react only sluggishly.

History 
Diborane was first synthesised in the 19th century by hydrolysis of metal borides, but it was never analysed. From 1912 to 1936, Alfred Stock, the major pioneer in the chemistry of boron hydrides, undertook his research that led to the methods for the synthesis and handling of the highly reactive, volatile, and often toxic boron hydrides. He proposed the first ethane-like structure of diborane. Electron diffraction measurements by S. H. Bauer initially appeared to support his proposed structure.

Because of a personal communication with L. Pauling (who supported the ethane-like structure), H. I. Schlessinger and A. B. Burg did not specifically discuss 3-center 2-electron bonding in their then classic review in the early 1940s. The review does, however, discuss the bridged D2h structure in some depth: "It is to be recognized that this formulation easily accounts for many of the chemical properties of diborane..."

In 1943, H. Christopher Longuet-Higgins, while still an undergraduate at Oxford, was the first to explain the structure and bonding of the boron hydrides. The article reporting the work, written with his tutor R. P. Bell, also reviews the history of the subject beginning with the work of Dilthey. Shortly afterwards, the theoretical work of Longuet-Higgins was confirmed in an infrared study of diborane by Price.
 
The structure was re-confirmed by electron-diffraction measurement in 1951 by K. Hedberg and V. Schomaker, with the confirmation of the structure shown in the schemes on this page.

William Nunn Lipscomb Jr. further confirmed the molecular structure of boranes using X-ray crystallography in the 1950s and developed theories to explain their bonding. Later, he applied the same methods to related problems, including the structure of carboranes, on which he directed the research of future 1981 Nobel Prize winner Roald Hoffmann. The 1976 Nobel Prize in Chemistry was awarded to Lipscomb "for his studies on the structure of boranes illuminating problems of chemical bonding".

Traditionally, diborane has often been described as electron-deficient, because the 12 valence electrons can only form 6 conventional 2-centre 2-electron bonds, which are insufficient to join all 8 atoms. However, the more correct description using 3-centre bonds shows that diborane is really electron-precise, since there are just enough valence electrons to fill the 6 bonding molecular orbitals. Nevertheless, some leading textbooks still use the term "electron-deficient".

Other uses 
Because of the exothermicity of its reaction with oxygen, diborane has been tested as a rocket propellant. Complete combustion is strongly exothermic. However, combustion is not complete in the rocket engine, as some boron monoxide, B2O, is produced. This conversion mirrors the incomplete combustion of hydrocarbons, to produce carbon monoxide (CO). Diborane also proved difficult to handle.

Diborane has been investigated as a precursor to metal boride films and for the p-doping of silicon semiconductors.

Safety 

Diborane is a pyrophoric gas. Commercially available adducts are typically used instead, at least for applications in organic chemistry.  These adducts include borane-tetrahydrofuran (borane-THF) and borane-dimethylsulfide.
The toxic effects of diborane are mitigated because the compound is so unstable in air.  The toxicity toward laboratory rats has been investigated.

References

Cited sources

Yerazunis, S., et al. “Solubility of Diborane in the Dimethyl Ether and Diethylene Glycol, in Mixtures of Sodium Borohydride and Dimethyl Ether of Diethylene Glycol, and in Ditertiary Butyl Sulfide.” Journal of Chemical & Engineering Data, vol. 7, no. 3, July 1962, pp. 337–39, doi:10.1021/je60014a004.

External links 
 International Chemical Safety Card 0432
 National Pollutant Inventory – Boron and compounds
 NIOSH Pocket Guide to Chemical Hazards
 U.S. EPA Acute Exposure Guideline Levels

Boranes
Rocket fuels
Reducing agents
Industrial gases
Sweet-smelling chemicals